Transcoder and Rate Adaptation Unit or TRAU, performs transcoding function for speech channels and RA (Rate Adaptation) for data channels in the GSM network. The Transcoder/Rate Adaptation Unit (TRAU) is the data rate conversion unit. The PSTN/ISDN switch is a switch for 64 kbit/s voice. Current technology permits to decrease the bit-rate (in GSM radio interface it is 16 kbit/s for full rate and 8 kbit/s
for half rate). Since MSC is basically a PSTN/ISDN switch its bit-rate is still 64 kbit/s. That is why a rate conversion is
required in between the BSC and MSC...

Transcoding is the compression of speech data from 64 kbit/s to 13/12.2/6.5 kbit/s in case FR/EFR/HR (respectively) speech coding.

Rate adaptation without transcoding allows Tandem Free Operation (TFO), allowing the original encoded speech data to be carried in a 64 kbit/s channel.  TFO offers benefits because transcoding can lead to a degradation of speech quality and requires computational resources.

Brief explanation
For an MS-to-MS call, the transmission path covers the radio access network (RAN) as
well as the core network (CN). Since the transmission modes and coding standards are
different for RAN and CN, speech data is converted/transcoded at the transition points
from RAN to CN. This conversion is performed in the TRAU network element which
connects RAN and CN.

16 kbit/s for FR (Full Rate), Redundancy (Channel Coding)= 9.8 kbit/s
=> Gross data rate after adding redundancy = 22.8 kbit/s
=>
12.2 kbit/s for EFR (Enhanced Full rate) => Gross data rate after adding redundancy = 11.4 kbit/s

See also
 Full Rate
 Half Rate
 Enhanced Full Rate
 Adaptive Multi-Rate

TRAU was also the term used for the frame format used in transport of the compressed bits from these speech coders.

References

Audio format converters